Hamlet station is an Amtrak train station in Hamlet, North Carolina, United States. The station is located within the Main Street Commercial Historic District and is in walking distance to the National Railroad Museum and Hall of Fame.

History

Hamlet Station was originally built in 1900 by the Seaboard Air Line Railroad as both a passenger station and a division headquarters. It was originally called the Seaboard Air Line Passenger Depot. In addition to serving the Seaboard's mainline trains between Richmond and Jacksonville, Florida (including the trains Silver Meteor and Silver Star), the station served until 1969 the Silver Comet bound southwest to Athens, Atlanta and Birmingham. Until 1958 the SAL operated a daily passenger train from Wilmington to the SAL's Charlotte station via Hamlet and Monroe.

The station was listed on the National Register of Historic Places on November 19, 1971. Between 2001 and 2004 the entire Queen Anne-style station house was moved across a set of tracks for safety, and converted into a museum by the North Carolina Department of Transportation.

Services
The facility is open daily at 5:30am-7:00am and at 10:30pm-12:30am; it includes a Quik-Trak kiosk, waiting area and restrooms. No baggage service is available at this station.

Hamlet Depot & Museums
Located inside the depot building, the museum showcases the history of both the Seaboard Railroad and the City of Hamlet, which includes hands-on exhibits, visual displays and interactive consoles. It also features a scaled model railroad display depicting Hamlet in the early 1950s.

References

External links 

Hamlet Station – NC By Train
 Hamlet Amtrak Station (USA Rail Guide -- Train Web)

Buildings and structures in Richmond County, North Carolina
Amtrak stations in North Carolina
H
Railway stations on the National Register of Historic Places in North Carolina
Railway stations in the United States opened in 1900
Transportation in Richmond County, North Carolina
National Register of Historic Places in Richmond County, North Carolina